Jana Zaumseil (born 1977) is a German chemist who is a professor of physical chemistry at Heidelberg University. She serves as Dean of the Faculty of Chemistry and Earth Sciences. Her research considers organic electronic materials for optoelectronics.

Early life and education 
Zaumseil was born in Jena and studied chemistry at Leipzig University. After earning her undergraduate degree, she joined Bell Labs and spent a year in Murray Hill, Manhattan, before moving to the Cavendish Laboratory. Zaumseil earned her doctorate at the University of Cambridge, where she worked with Henning Sirringhaus on ambipolar organic field effect transistors. She held a Gates Cambridge Scholarship. She was a postdoctoral fellow at the Argonne National Laboratory, based in the Center for Nanoscale Materials.

Research and career 
In 2009, Zaumseil moved to the University of Erlangen–Nuremberg. Shortly after arriving in Nuremberg she was awarded the Alfried-Krupp-Förderpreis. She started to work on plasmic nano antennas that could enhance the performance of light-emitting diodes. She was made a Chair in Physical Chemistry at Heidelberg University.

Zaumseil was awarded a European Research Council Consolidator Grant in 2018.

Selected publications

References 

1977 births
Living people
21st-century German chemists
21st-century German women scientists
German women chemists
People from Jena
Leipzig University alumni
Alumni of the University of Cambridge
Argonne National Laboratory people
Scientists at Bell Labs
Academic staff of the University of Erlangen-Nuremberg
Academic staff of Heidelberg University
Scientists of the Cavendish Laboratory